Kentucky Route 355 (KY 355) is a state highway in Kentucky that runs from US 127 near Monterey to KY 227 near Worthville. KY 355 is entirely inside Owen County and passes through the unincorporated communities of Gratz and Perry 
Park. KY 355 provides direct access from Carrollton to Frankfort. KY 355 begins on jointhe northern side of Monterey. After a short run east, it curves to the north. Before entering Gratz, KY 22 joins KY 355 and both head into Gratz. Both routes turn on a side street before coming to a T Intersection. KY 355 goes to the left, while KY 22 goes to the right on its way to Owenton. KY 355 continues heading north and ends at KY 227 in northwestern Owen County.

Major intersections

References

0355
0355